Legislative Assembly elections were held in Gujarat, in 1995, to elect the members of the 9th Gujarat Legislative Assembly. Bharatiya Janata Party won 121 seats. Keshubhai Patel become Chief Minister after Election for first time. Congress won 45 seat, better than last election (33 seats in 1990 election).

Results

Elected members

See also
1995–1997 Gujarat political crisis

References

1990s in Gujarat
State Assembly elections in Gujarat
Gujarat